Casey Dellacqua and Scott Lipsky were the defending champions. Dellacqua chose not to participate this year while Lipsky partnered with Vladimíra Uhlířová, but they were defeated in the first round by Virginie Razzano and Nicolas Devilder.
Sania Mirza and Mahesh Bhupathi won the tournament defeating Klaudia Jans-Ignacik of Poland and Santiago González of Mexico 7–6(7–3), 6–1 in the final.

Seeds

Draw

Finals

Top half

Bottom half

References

External links
 Main draw
2012 French Open – Doubles draws and results at the International Tennis Federation

Mixed Doubles
French Open by year – Mixed doubles